Syed Moazzem Hossain Alal is a Bangladesh Nationalist Party politician and the former Member of Parliament of Barisal-2.

Career
Alal was elected to parliament from Barisal-2 as a Bangladesh Nationalist Party candidate in 2001.

References

Bangladesh Nationalist Party politicians
Living people
8th Jatiya Sangsad members
6th Jatiya Sangsad members
Year of birth missing (living people)